Air entrainment in concrete is the intentional creation of tiny air bubbles in a batch by adding an air entraining agent during mixing. A form of surfactant (a surface-active substance that in the instance reduces the surface tension between water and solids) it allows bubbles of a desired size to form. These are created during concrete mixing (while the slurry is in its liquid state), with most surviving to remain part of it when hardened. 

Air entrainment makes concrete more workable during placement, and increases its durability when hardened, particularly in climates subject to freeze-thaw cycles.

Process
Though hardened concrete appears as a compact solid, it is actually highly porous (typical concrete porosity: ~ 6 – 12 vol.%), having small capillaries resulting from the evaporation of water beyond that required for the hydration reaction. A water to cement ratio (w/c) of approximately 0.38 (this means 38 lbs. of water for every 100 lbs. of cement) is required for all the cement particles to hydrate. Water beyond that is surplus and is used to make the plastic concrete more workable or easily flowing or less viscous. To achieve a suitable slump to be workable, most concrete has a w/c of 0.45 to 0.60 at the time of placement, which means there is substantial excess water that will not react with cement. When the excess water evaporates it leaves little pores in its place. Environmental water can later fill these voids through capillary action. During freeze-thaw cycles, the water occupying those pores expands and creates tensile stresses which lead to tiny cracks. These cracks allow more water into the concrete and the cracks enlarge. Eventually the concrete spalls – chunks break off. The failure of reinforced concrete is most often due to this cycle, which is accelerated by moisture reaching the reinforcing steel, causing it to rust, expand, create more cracks, let in more water, and aggravate the decomposition cycle.

Size
The voids they create can be compressed a little, acting to reduce or absorb stresses from freezing. Air entraining was introduced in the 1930s and most modern concrete, especially if subjected to freezing temperatures, is air-entrained. The bubbles contribute to workability by acting as a sort of lubricant for all the aggregates and large sand particles in a concrete mix.

Entrapped air
In addition to intentionally entrained air hardened concrete also typically contains some amount of entrapped air. These are larger bubbles, creating larger voids, known as "honeycombing", and are typically less evenly distributed than entrained air.  Proper concrete placement, which often includes vibration to settle it into place and drive out entrapped air, particularly in wall forms, is essential to minimizing deleterious entrapped air.

References

Concrete